Charles W. Dorman is a retired Brigadier General for the United States Marine Corps, and was the former Chief Judge for the Navy-Marine Corps Court of Criminal Appeals.

Dorman served as an attorney & judge for the Marine Corps for 33 years.  In his career, he handled over 300 cases for the Government.

Education
Dorman graduated from the University of Florida in 1970 with his bachelor's degree, and in 1973 he received his Juris Doctor from UF as well.  In 1980 he received his LLM from the George Washington University

References

External links

 Dorman's Profile

1952 births
University of Florida alumni
Living people
United States Marine Corps generals
Fredric G. Levin College of Law alumni